Kimberly Sophia Albeño Hinestroza (born 8 June 1993), known as Kimmy Albeño, is an American-born Guatemalan footballer who plays as a forward for German club 1. FFV Erfurt and the Guatemala women's national team.

International goals
Scores and results list Guatemala's goal tally first

See also
List of Guatemala women's international footballers

References

1993 births
Living people
People with acquired Guatemalan citizenship
Guatemalan women's footballers
Women's association football forwards
Women's association football midfielders
Guatemala women's international footballers
Central American Games bronze medalists for Guatemala
Central American Games medalists in football
Guatemalan expatriate footballers
Guatemalan expatriate sportspeople in Germany
American women's soccer players
Soccer players from Long Beach, California
American people of Guatemalan descent
American sportspeople of North American descent
Sportspeople of Guatemalan descent
Lamar Lady Cardinals soccer players
American expatriate women's soccer players
American expatriate soccer players in Germany
Woodrow Wilson High School (Los Angeles) alumni